Joint Vision 2020 was a document released on May 30, 2000, by the United States Department of Defense proclaiming the need for "full-spectrum dominance" on the battlefield.  The Joint Vision 2020 concepts have subsequently formed the basis of United States military doctrine.

The document envisages the military threats that might confront the United States in the year 2020 and possible responses to these threats. Information operations were a primary focus of the document, as well as the rapidly-accelerating pace of technological development.

See also 
 Network-centric warfare

External links 
Joint Vision 2020 online version (Archived on Nov 30, 2001)
"Joint Vision 2020 Emphasizes Full-spectrum Dominance". Defense Link article, June 2000

United States Department of Defense publications
United States military policies
2020 in the United States
2000 documents